Pradleves is a comune (municipality) in the Province of Cuneo in the Italian region Piedmont, located about  southwest of Turin and about  west of Cuneo.

Pradleves borders the following municipalities: Castelmagno, Demonte, Dronero, and Monterosso Grana.

Demographic evolution

References

Cities and towns in Piedmont

lmo:Pradleves